Thomas Fane, 6th Earl of Westmorland  (3 October 1681 – 4 June 1736), styled The Honourable Thomas Fane from 1691 to 1699, was a British peer and member of the House of Lords. He was the third son (second surviving son) of Vere Fane, 4th Earl of Westmorland and his wife Rachel Bence; as well as the younger brother of Vere Fane, and the older brother of John Fane, 7th Earl of Westmorland. As his older brother Vere died without issue in 1699, Thomas Fane inherited the Earldom of Westmorland, as well as his brother's further titles Baron Burghersh and Baron le Despencer.

Fane held many offices, including that of Deputy Warden of the Cinque Ports between 1705 and 1708, First Lord of Trade between 1719 and 1735 and Lord-Lieutenant of Northamptonshire in 1735. Furthermore, he was Gentleman of the Bedchamber to Queen Anne's husband, Prince George of Denmark, on 25 April 1704, and Lord of the Bedchamber to King George I in 1715. In 1717, he was invested as a Privy Counsellor.

Fane married Catherine Stringer, daughter of Thomas Stringer in 1707, and they were married until she died on 4 February 1730. Fane himself died on 4 June 1736 without any issue, and was succeeded as 7th Earl of Westmorland, 7th Baron Burhersh and 10th Lord le Despencer by his younger brother, general John Fane.

References

Literature

1681 births
1736 deaths
17th-century English nobility
18th-century English nobility
18th-century English politicians
Thomas
Members of the Privy Council of Great Britain
Earls of Westmorland
Presidents of the Board of Trade
Lord-Lieutenants of Northamptonshire
Barons le Despencer
Barons Burghersh